Rusichthys is a genus of ray-finned fishes, classified under the subfamily Congrogadinae, the eel blennies, part of the dottyback family, Pseudochromidae, from the western Indian Ocean. The generic name is a compound of the acronym RUSI which stands for Rhodes University Smith Institute and thus honours the South African ichthyologist James Leonard Brierley Smith

Species
The following species are classified in the genus Rusichthys:

 Rusichthys explicitus Winterbottom, 1996
 Rusichthys plesiomorphus Winterbottom, 1979

References

Congrogadinae